Paras may refer to:

People
 Parshvanatha, 23rd Tirthankara of Jainism
 Paras Shah, former Crown Prince of Nepal
 Andre Paras, Filipino actor and son of Benjie Paras
 Benjie Paras, Filipino actor and former professional basketball player
 Paras Khadka (born 1987), Nepalese cricketer
 Kobe Paras (born 1997), Filipino basketball player and son of Benjie Paras

Places
 Paras District, one of six districts of the province Cangallo in Peru
 Parás, Nuevo León, a town in Northern Mexico.

Other uses
 Paras (1949 film), a romantic drama Indian film 
 Paras (1971 film), a Hindi film
 Paras (serial), a 2015 Pakistani drama serial produced by A & B Entertainment
PRL Advanced Radial-velocity All-sky Search, an astronomy project
 Paratroopers
 Parachute Regiment (United Kingdom), a unit in the British Army, known as "the Paras"
  Parash Pathar, the name for philosopher's stone in India
 Paras (Pokémon)